Harry Lockhart (born 8 August 1952) is a Bahamian sprinter. He competed in the men's 4 × 100 metres relay at the 1972 Summer Olympics.

References

1952 births
Living people
Athletes (track and field) at the 1972 Summer Olympics
Bahamian male sprinters
Olympic athletes of the Bahamas
Place of birth missing (living people)